Acervulinacea is a superfamily in the Foraminifera order Rotaliida. The Acervulinacea may be free, or able to move about, or their tests may be attached to some substrate. The early growth stage is spiral, followed by irregular chambers that form an irregular mass, disc, or branching structure. The test wall is of hyaline (glassy) optically radial calcite and is coarsely perforate. Apertures are present only as mural pores.

The Acervulinacea contains two families with living genera, the Acervulinidae of Schultze, 1854 and the Homotrematidae of Loeblich and Tappan, 1964. The Acervulinidae are characterized by a free or attached test with an early spiral stage followed by spreading chambers in one or more layers. The range is from Paleocene to recent. Example genera are Acervulina and Gypsina. The Homotrematidae are characterized by an attached test with early chambers in an irregular trochospiral, later chambers numerous in a 
massive or branching structure growing up from the attachment. Apertures are large, by a perforated plate. Range: Eocene to Recent. Genera include Homotrema and Miniarcina.

References

 Forminiferal Genera and their classification, Alfred R. Loeblich jr. and Helen Tappan 1988. (e-book)
 Modern Foraminifera By Barun K. Sen Gupta 2002 

Foraminifera superfamilies
Rotaliida